The standard modern rugby union numbering schemes have the starting players numbered from 1 to 15, and the replacements numbered 16 onwards. But rugby union players have not always been identified by individual labels, nor have the systems used always been the same.

History of the use of numbers on shirts
The first use of numbered shirts was the match between New Zealand and Queensland at Brisbane, Queensland in 1897 to allow the spectators to identify the players. In that match, New Zealand wore the numbers 1 to 15, starting at fullback, while the hosts wore the numbers 16 to 30.

The practice was adopted for various major internationals, but no definitive system was adopted. The matter was brought before the International Rugby Board by the English and Welsh Rugby Unions in 1921, but it was decided that the identification of players by marking their shirts was a matter to be determined by the team themselves. Most teams used numbers, but in the 1930s, the Welsh used letters. In the early days, a "back row" was truly a back row, with all three players packing down with their shoulders driving the second row (rather than with the flankers driving the props directly as is usual today). Therefore, in many numbering systems these three players were numbered to reflect that (rather than with the two flankers having consecutive numbers as it is today).

Scotland first adopted a numbering system in 1928 for the match against France, but dropped it again immediately. Thus when Scotland played England that year, King George V who attended the game asked why the Scottish players were not numbered, the former president of the Scottish Football Union (as it was then) James Aikman Smith answered, "This, Sir, is a rugby match, not a cattle sale."

By the 1950s, the Rugby Football Union had produced a booklet called Know the Game, in which it is stated that "there are no hard and fast rules governing the names of the positions or the numbers worn", but it lists the custom in Britain as being 1 for the fullback, to 15 for the lock (now known as the number 8). Rugby league still uses this "correct" numbering system.

A number of different systems are used to publish team lists in newspapers, match programmes and online. In most of the world, players are listed in numerical order, either 1-15 or 15-1. Another common system is to list the backs 15–9, followed by the forwards 1–8, although traditionalists prefer 15–9, 1–5, 6,8,7, i.e. the forwards in scrum order.

By 1950, all the home nations used numbers; England, Scotland and Wales used the system described above, while France and Ireland did the reverse, using what would now be described as the modern system. By the 1960–61 season, however, they had all agreed to use the France/Ireland system, with 1 being loosehead prop and 15 being the fullback.

Modern numbering

There is nothing in the Laws of Rugby Union that determines if or how players should be individually identified by marking their clothing. However, since 1967, player numbering has been standardised by World Rugby for international matches (1–15, with 1 being loosehead prop and 15 being the fullback; the replacements are then numbered from 16 onwards, with the forwards first from the front row to the number eight, followed by the backs from scrum-half to full-back). English Premiership sides have also adopted this standard numbering system to better aid the understanding of spectators new to the sport, necessitating that Leicester abandon their traditional lettering system, though they have attempted to keep the tradition alive by printing a small letter appropriate to the player's position next to the club badge on the left breast.

In South Africa, the blindside flanker wears 7 and openside flanker wears 6.

Numbering in rugby sevens
In rugby sevens, although World Rugby requires that players wear numbers, it does not dictate a specific scheme tied to the player's position. Accordingly, most teams use permanent squad numbering, although numbering generally starts with the forwards.

Exceptional systems

Traditionally, some clubs (notably Leicester Tigers and Bristol) have used alternative schemes consisting of letters, Bath and Richmond have used a scheme without a number 13. Other common variations in the numbering are the interchange of 6 and 7 (particularly in South Africa and Argentina) or of 11 and 14.

Other exceptions include:
 West Hartlepool RFC hung up their No. 5 jersey in memory of their lock John How who died of a heart condition in a 1994 league match. 
 Waitete Rugby Club (affiliated to the King Country Rugby Football Union in New Zealand) replace the number 5 with 55, in honour of Colin Meads.
 The rugby team of the School of Oriental and African Studies, University of London, which used to use a system of ancient Thai numbers, making identification by opposing teams virtually impossible. 
 Will Greenwood, who normally played at inside centre, preferred to wear the number 13 shirt rather than the usual number 12 assigned to this position for superstitious reasons. During the 2003 Rugby World Cup Final he played inside centre wearing number 13 and Mike Tindall played outside him in the number 12 shirt.
 Diocesan College, the first school to play rugby in South Africa, has always played without numbers to emphasise that team aspect of the sport. Other South African schools such as Pietermartizburg College in Kwa Zulu Natal province adopted the same approach until recent years when they decided to use player identification numbers likely due to television coverage of matches and referees and officials needing to cite players by number.

Historical and traditional schemes

See also
 Rugby shirt
 Rugby union positions

References

Numbering
History of rugby union
Rugby union